To be distinguished from his son who was the Governor of Assam, Muhammad Saleh Akbar Hydari.

Sir Muhammad Akbar Nazar Ali Hydari, Sadr ul-Maham, PC (1869–1941) was an Indian politician. He served as the Prime Minister of Hyderabad State from 18 March 1937 to September 1941.

Early life

Hydari was born on 8 November 1869 into a Sulaymani Bohra community of Muslims. His father was Seth Nazar Ali Hydari, a businessman based in Bombay.

Career

Hydari served in the Indian Audit and Accountancy Service before moving to Hyderabad State where he became the finance minister and later the prime minister. He was largely responsible for the restoration of the Ajanta Caves. He also represented Hyderabad at the First Round Table Conference during November 1930 – January 1931.

In January 1936, he was appointed a member of the Privy Council of the United Kingdom. He was appointed in 1941, he was appointed as a member of the Viceroy's Executive Council.

Family 
He was the father of Muhammad Saleh Akbar Hydari through his wife Amina Hydari of the Tyabji family. His grand daughter, Habiba Hydari married the Goan painter, Mario Miranda.

Honours
Hydari was knighted by the British government in the 1928 Birthday Honours. and was formally invested with his knighthood at Hyderabad on 17 December 1929 by the Viceroy, the Lord Irwin.

See also
 Aditi Rao Hydari
 Mario Miranda

References

External links
 The India List and India Office List for - Page 687 - Google Books

Knights Bachelor
Indian Knights Bachelor
1869 births
1941 deaths
Indian Muslims
Indian Ismailis
Sulaymani Bohras
Indian members of the Privy Council of the United Kingdom
Prime Ministers of Hyderabad State
People from Hyderabad State
Members of the Council of the Governor General of India
Tyabji family